The Four T's or 4 T's may refer to:
 A mnemonic for tumours in the anterior mediastinum
 A score for estimating the likelihood of heparin-induced thrombocytopenia
 The plural of several things known as 4T - see 4T (disambiguation)

See also
 T4 (disambiguation)
 TTTT